EK Zeller Eisbären, also known as EK Zell am See, is an ice hockey team based in Zell am See, Austria. As of the 2022–23 season, they play in the Alps Hockey League. The club was founded in 1928.

Honours
Austrian National League champions: 1961, 1979, 1986, 1990, 1991, 2003, 2005

External links
Official website 

Ice hockey clubs established in 1928
Ice hockey teams in Austria
Alpenliga teams
Inter-National League teams
Austrian National League teams
EK
1928 establishments in Austria